Chinedu Aaron Ekene (born 15 January 2001) is a German professional footballer who plays as a midfielder for MSV Duisburg.

Career
After spendings several years at 1899 Hoffenheim, he moved to MSV Duisburg in the summer of 2021. He made his professional debut in the 3. Liga on 21 August 2021, in the away match against 1. FC Magdeburg.

Career statistics

References

External links

2001 births
Living people
Sportspeople from Wuppertal
German footballers
Association football forwards
Footballers from North Rhine-Westphalia
MSV Duisburg players
3. Liga players
Regionalliga players
TSG 1899 Hoffenheim II players
Germany youth international footballers
German people of Nigerian descent